Reil T. Cervantes (born August 16, 1986) is a Filipino professional basketball player for the Batang Kankaloo – Caloocan of the Pilipinas Super League. He was drafted 9th by Barangay Ginebra Kings in the 2011 PBA draft.

In 2014, Cervantes was drafted 2nd overall by Kia Sorento in the 2014 PBA Expansion Draft.

PBA career statistics

Correct as of September 21, 2016

Season-by-season averages
 
|-
| align=left | 
| align=left | Barangay Ginebra
| 13 ||	5.6 || .333 || .000 || .429 || 1.7 ||	.1 ||	.0 ||	.0 ||	1.8
|-
| align=left | 
| align=left | Barako Bull
| 4 ||	5.5 || .167 || .000 || .000 || .5 ||	.0 ||	.0 ||	.0 ||	0.5
|-
| align=left | 
| align=left | Kia / Blackwater
| 29 ||	24.8 || .361 || .264 || .641 || 4.5 ||	1.3 ||	.2 ||	.1 ||	11.9
|-
| align=left | 
| align=left | Blackwater
| 29 ||	20.4 || .368 || .328 || .803 || 2.6 ||	.8 ||	.3 ||	.0 ||	10.7
|-class=sortbottom
| align=center colspan=2 | Career
| 75 ||	18.8 || .361 || .296 || .685 || 3.1 ||	.8 ||	.2 ||	.1 ||	9.1

References

1986 births
Living people
Barako Bull Energy players
Barangay Ginebra San Miguel players
Basketball players from Catanduanes
Blackwater Bossing players
Filipino expatriate basketball people in Malaysia
Filipino men's basketball players
Terrafirma Dyip players
Power forwards (basketball)
FEU Tamaraws basketball players
Kuala Lumpur Dragons players
Maharlika Pilipinas Basketball League players
Barangay Ginebra San Miguel draft picks